Bulbine is a genus of plants in the family Asphodelaceae and subfamily Asphodeloideae, named for the bulb-shaped tuber of many species. It was formerly placed in the Liliaceae. It is found chiefly in Southern Africa, with a few species extending into tropical Africa and a few others in Australia and Yemen.

Bulbine is a genus of succulent plants with flowers borne in lax or compound racemes. The flowers are usually yellow, with bearded stamens; some species have white, orange, or pink flowers. Several species are grown in gardens, especially B. frutescens. Species of Bulbine resemble Haworthia and Aloe in appearance, but with soft, fleshy leaves and tuberous roots or a caudex. They are shrubs, weedy perennials, dwarf geophytes (including B. lolita, the smallest of all succulent Monocots ), and soft annuals. Many of the dwarf species have small, dome-shaped tubers.

Dormancy usually extends from late spring to autumn, but it varies among species and in different conditions. The leaves die and drop, the roots contract into the caudex, and the aboveground parts wither. Propagation is mostly by seed, but some species form multiple heads or offsets and can be propagated with cuttings.

Species
Species include:
Bulbine abyssinica A.Rich.
Bulbine alata Baijnath
Bulbine alooides (L.) Willd.
Bulbine alveolata S.A.Hammer
Bulbine angustifolia Poelln.
Bulbine annua (L.) Willd.
Bulbine asphodeloides (L.) Spreng.
Bulbine bachmannii Baker
Bulbine bruynsii S.A.Hammer
Bulbine bulbosa (R.Br.) Haw.
Bulbine capensis Baijnath ex G.Will.
Bulbine capitata Poelln.
Bulbine cepacea (Burm.f.) Wijnands
Bulbine coetzeei Oberm.
Bulbine crassa D.I.Morris & Duretto
Bulbine cremnophila van Jaarsv.
Bulbine crocea Guth.
Bulbine dactylopsoides G.Will.
Bulbine dewetii van Jarssv.
Bulbine diphylla Schltr. ex Poelln.
Bulbine disimilis G.Will.
Bulbine erectipilosa G.Will.
Bulbine erumpens S.A.Hammer
Bulbine esterhuyseniae Baijnath
Bulbine fallax Poelln.
Bulbine favosa (Thunb.) Schult. & Schult.f.
Bulbine flexicaulis Baker
Bulbine flexuosa Schltr.
Bulbine foleyi E.Phillips
Bulbine fragilis G.Williamson
Bulbine francescae G.Will. & Baijnath
Bulbine frutescens (L.) Willd.
Bulbine glauca (Raf.) E.M.Watson
Bulbine haworthioides B.Nord.
Bulbine inamarxiae G.Will. & A.P.Dold
Bulbine inflata Oberm.
Bulbine lagopus (Thunb.) N.E.Br.
Bulbine lamprophylla Williamson
Bulbine latifolia (L.f.) Spreng.
Bulbine lavrani G.Will. & Baijnath
Bulbine lolita S.A.Hammer
Bulbine longifolia Schinz
Bulbine louwii L.I.Hall
Bulbine margarethae L.I.Hall
Bulbine meiringii van Jaarsv.
Bulbine melanovaginata G.Will.
Bulbine mesembryanthemoides Haw.
Bulbine minima Baker
Bulbine monophylla Poelln.
Bulbine muscicola G.Will.
Bulbine namaensis Schinz
Bulbine narcissifolia Salm-Dyck
Bulbine navicularifolia G.Will.
Bulbine nutans Roem. & Schult.
Bulbine ophiophylla G.Will.
Bulbine pendens G.Will. & Baijnath
Bulbine pendula Keighery
Bulbine praemorsa (Jacq.) Spreng.
Bulbine quartzicola G.Williamson
Bulbine ramosa van Jaarsv.
Bulbine retinens van Jaarsv. & S.A.Hammer
Bulbine rhopalophylla Dinter
Bulbine rupicola G.Will.
Bulbine sedifolia Schltr. ex Poelln.
Bulbine semenaliundata G.Will.
Bulbine semibarbata (R.Br.) Haw.
Bulbine stolonifera Baijnath ex G.Will.
Bulbine striata Baijnath & Van Jaarsv.
Bulbine succulenta Compton
Bulbine suurbergensis van Jaarsv. & A.E.van Wyk
Bulbine thomasiae van Jaarsv.
Bulbine torsiva G.Williamson
Bulbine torta N.E.Br.
Bulbine triebneri Dinter
Bulbine truncata G.Williamson
Bulbine vagans E.M.Watson
Bulbine vitrea G.Will. & Baijnath
Bulbine vittatifolia G.Williamson
Bulbine wiesei L.I.Hall

References

 
Asphodelaceae genera
Taxonomy articles created by Polbot
Succulent plants